The 1948 Canisius Golden Griffins football team was an American football team that represented Canisius College in the Western New York Little Three Conference (Little Three) during the 1948 college football season. Canisius compiled a 7–2–1  record, won the Little Three championship, lost to John Carroll in the Great Lakes Bowl, and outscored all opponents by a total of 242 to 109. 

James B. Wilson was hired in March 1948 as the team's head football coach. He had previously served as the school's head football coach from 1939 until 1942 when the school discontinued football for the duration of World War II.

Three Canisius players were selected by the United Press as first-team players on the All-Upstate New York football team: tackle George Eberle; guard George Kuhrt; and halfback Howie Willis.

Schedule

References

Canisius
Canisius Golden Griffins football seasons
Canisius Golden Griffins football